The 1945 Haverford Fords men's soccer team represented Haverford College during the 1945 ISFL season. It was the Fords 46th season as a varsity program.

The Fords finished the 1945 with an undefeated 6-0 record, winning both the Middle Atlantic States Athletic Conference championship, and the Middle Atlantic Intercollegiate Soccer League championship. Due to World War II, there was no formal national champion declared by ISFA at this time, although the college, along with three other colleges (Army, Navy, and Yale) self-declared themselves as champions for the 1945 ISFA season. This has since been recognized by the American Soccer History Archives as a claimed national title. To date, this is the most recent year Haverford won a national soccer championship at any level.

Ev Jones lead the Fords in scoring, scoring 13 goals in the six matches played during the regular season.

Background 
The Fords finished the 1944 season with a record of 5-2-2. The program scored 29 goals over the course of the nine-match season, and allowed 29 goals. Junior Paul Domincovich led Haverford in goals during the 1944 ISFA season, scoring nine goals in nine matches. Redshirt sophomore, Bob Clayton was second on the team with five goals.

Roster

Schedule

Honors

ISFA All-Americans 
 Bob Clayton, Defender

References

External links 
1945 Season Stats

Haverford
1945
1945
Haverford Fords men's soccer